Polydesmidea is a suborder of flat-backed millipedes under the order Polydesmida.

References

Polydesmida
Arthropod suborders